Who's Gonna Go Your Crooked Mile? is a compilation album by American singer-songwriter Peter Case, released in 2004. It includes three previously unreleased songs.

Critical reception

Writing for Allmusic, music critic Mark Deming wrote "…if you want a potent reminder of just how good a songwriter Case is, and how well he can make his material work in the studio, this album offers the evidence in spades." Russell Hall of No Depression magazine reviewed the album and wrote "Case rarely comes off as strident; few singers are better than he at conveying a yearning, scruffy romanticism. Moreover, songs such as the rockabilly throwaway “Coulda Shoulda Woulda" show that sometimes Case is concerned with nothing more than having a good time."

Track listing
All songs written by Peter Case unless otherwise noted.
"Wake Up Call" – 3:28
"My Generation's Golden Handcuff Blues" – 4:12
"Crooked Mile" – 4:14
"Blind Luck" (Case, Fred Koller) – 4:16
"Spell of Wheels" (Case, Joshua Case) – 5:13
"On the Way Downtown" (Peter Case, Joshua Case) – 3:33
"Let Me Fall" – 4:14
"Two Heroes" (Case, LeRoy Marinell) – 6:11
"Blues Distance" – 4:48
"Coulda Shoulda Woulda" (Case, Kevin Bowe, Duane Jarvis) – 2:41
"Cold Trail Blues" – 4:36
"If You've Got a Light to Shine" – 4:03
"Something's Coming" – 5:43
"I Hear Your Voice" – 5:01
"First Light" – 4:56
"Gone" – 3:47

Personnel
Peter Case – vocals, guitar, harmonica, piano
Sandy Chila – drums
Lili Haydn – violin
Gabe Witcher – violin
Brad Rice – bass
Eric Rigler – uilleann pipes
Jerry Scheff – bass
Willie Aron – electric piano
Joshua Case – guitar, Wurlitzer
Bryan Head – drums, glockenspiel
Don Heffington – bodhran, drums, footsteps, jaw harp, percussion
David P. Jackson – bass
Warren Klein – tamboura
Greg Leisz – guitar, Llap steel guitar, pedal steel guitar
David Meshell – bass
Darrell Leonard – horn
Joe Sublett – horn
Steven Soles – harmony, background vocals
Billy Swan – harmony, background vocals
Jeff Big Dad Turmes – clarinet, saxophone
Andrew Williams – harmonium, harmony vocals, background vocals, guitar

Production
Andrew Williams – producer, engineer, mixing
Peter Case – producer, engineer
Joshua Case – producer, mixing, computer editing
J. Steven Soles – producer
Larry Hirsch – producer
Gavin Lurssen – compilation mastering
Geoff Pearlman – engineer
Greg Allen – package design, photography

References

2004 albums
Peter Case albums
Vanguard Records albums